Lo scippo (the snatching) is a 1965 Italian film. It marked the directorial debut of Nando Cicero.

Plot
Speranza, a female company cashier, organizes with two young men with a motorcycle a snatching for stage a steal with money of customers. However, the bills are counterfeit because they have been changed out by Linzalone another bank's employee. But the money bag is unfortunely intercepted and steal to employee outside the bank by a couple of real thieves.

Cast
Paolo Ferrari
Gabriele Ferzetti
Fiorenzo Fiorentini
Margaret Lee
Didi Perego
Mario Pisu : Frascà
Maria Laura Rocca
Enrico Maria Salerno : Linzalone
Vinicio Sofia
Annette Stroyberg
Valeria Valeri : Speranza

External links 
 

1965 films
Italian comedy films
1960s Italian-language films
Films directed by Nando Cicero
Films scored by Piero Umiliani
1965 directorial debut films
1960s Italian films